Persoonia tropica is a plant in the family Proteaceae and is endemic to north Queensland.

Description

Taxonomy
Persoonia tropica was first formally described in 1994 by Peter Weston and Lawrie Johnson in the journal Telopea from specimens collected in 1991 near Koombooloomba Dam.

Distribution and habitat

Conservation status
Persoonia tropica is listed as of "least concern under the Queensland Government Nature Conservation Act 1992''.

References

tropica
Flora of Queensland
Plants described in 1994
Taxa named by Lawrence Alexander Sidney Johnson
Taxa named by Peter H. Weston